Lev Tolstoy is a rural locality (a settlement) and the administrative center of Lev-Tolstovsky District of Lipetsk Oblast, Russia. Population:  Until 1932 it was known as Astapovo.

History
Astapovo railway station, built in 1891 on the intersection of the Kozlov–Volovo and Moscow–Yelets routes, was named after a nearby selo of Astapovo, which was founded later than the mid-17th century. The name derives from the masculine first name Ostap.  The Russian writer Leo Tolstoy fell ill at the Astapovo station and died here on November 7, 1910. To commemorate this event, the station was renamed Lva Tolstogo in 1918. In 1932, the name of the station and of the settlement was changed to its modern form.

References

Notes

Sources

Е. М. Поспелов (Ye. M. Pospelov). "Имена городов: вчера и сегодня (1917–1992). Топонимический словарь." (City Names: Yesterday and Today (1917–1992). Toponymic Dictionary.) Москва, "Русские словари", 1993.

External links
 Unofficial website of Lev Tolstoy settlement

Rural localities in Lipetsk Oblast
